Aloysius Benedictus "Ben" Mboi (22 May 1935 – 23 June 2015) was the Governor of East Nusa Tenggara from 1978 to 1988. By profession he was a physician. His spouse, Nafsiah Mboi, who is also a physician, was Minister of Health from 14 June 2012 until 20 October 2014.

Ben Mboi died in Jakarta at the age of 80 on 23 June 2015.

References

1935 births
Governors of East Nusa Tenggara
University of Indonesia alumni
Indonesian Roman Catholics
People from East Nusa Tenggara
20th-century Indonesian physicians
2015 deaths